The Moore Mountains are a small but conspicuous group of mountains just north of New Year Pass in the Queen Elizabeth Range in Antarctica. They were observed in 1957 by the New Zealand southern party of the Commonwealth Trans-Antarctic Expedition (1956–58) and named for R.D. Moore, Treasurer of the Ross Sea Committee.

References

Mountain ranges of the Ross Dependency
Shackleton Coast